Hanover University of Music, Drama and Media (abbreviated to HMTMH) is a university of performing arts and media in Hanover, the capital of Lower Saxony, Germany. Since 2010, its president has been Susanne Rode-Breymann.

History
The origins of the university date back to 1897 with the establishment of the private Conservatory of Music. However, just over a decade later, in 1911, it became the conservatory for the city and changed name to Hanover Conservatory (also called ). In 1943, during the Second World War, it became State Music School. After the war, in 1950, it merged with the private Hanover Drama School becoming the Academy of Music and Theatre, before attaining college status a few years later in 1958 (although back-dated to 1 April 1957) and being separated into the Lower Saxon College of Music and Theatre and the Lower Saxon School for Music Hanover. However, on 1 October 1962 these two were recombined into the State College of Music and Drama Hanover (abbreviated to HMTH and simply called ).

Between 1970 and 1973 a new dedicated main building was constructed at the very edge of the Eilenriede city forest. Since 2001 the university has had the Institute for Early Advancement of Highly Gifted Musicians (abbreviated to IFF), and in 2010 the Institute of Chamber Music and the Institute for Early Music was founded.

Facilities

From above, the main building of the university has the shape of an ear, which is also reflected in the university’s logo. At the time of its construction it was one of the most modern buildings designed specifically for an artistic institution. In addition to the main building, the university has sites throughout Hanover:
2–4Administration
 at 39formerly the home of a director of Continental, acquired in 2006 for the European Centre for Jewish Music and opened in 2012 after restoration
48Institute for Music Psychology and Musician Medicine
3 Research Centre for Music and Gender (Institute for Music Education Research ( and Institute for Music Sciences
Expo Plaza 12Acting and Institute of Journalism and Communication Research 
35Institute for Old Music
21
8Institute for Jazz, Rock and Pop

Courses 
The emphasis at HMTMH is music education, artistic education, solo training, and theatre training. Also taught are jazz, rock, pop as part of a popular music program, with an emphasis on jazz. The study programs in the areas of piano, orchestra and chamber music are particularly pronounced, especially in artistic education and music education.

The drama and opera departments are in close cooperation with Hanover State Opera, Hanover Drama and the radio orchestra of the northern German broadcaster NDR. The university stages about two annual opera productions, including premieres, and about three orchestral concerts. The university also maintains artistic and scientific relations with several national and international music colleges and universities, including in Switzerland, Eastern Europe and East Asia.

Organ 
Called the Spanish organ, it was installed on the north balcony in 1998–2001 and reflects principles of Spanish Baroque organ building without copying a specific instrument.

Notable people
The university has had the following presidents:

 1979–1993 Richard Jakoby (since 1968 as director of the predecessor institution)
 1993–1997 Peter Becker
 1997–2003 Klaus-Ernst Behne
 2003–2005 Katja Schaefer
 2006–2009 Rolf-Burkhard Klieme
 Since 2010 Susanne Rode-Breymann

Lecturers

Theo Altmeyer, voice
Markus Becker, piano
Hans Christoph Becker-Foss, organ and early music studies
Martin Brauß, piano
Frank Bungarten, guitar
Liuben Dimitrov (Genova & Dimitrov), piano duo
Karl Engel, pianist
Reinhard Febel, composition
Aglika Genova (Genova & Dimitrov), piano duo
Jean-Claude Gérard, flute
André Gertler, violin
Carla Henius, voice
Heinz Hennig, choral conducting
Karl-Heinz Kämmerling, piano
Wilfried Köpke, journalism
Alfred Koerppen, composition
Ladislav Kupkovič, music theory
Helmut Lachenmann, composition
Diether de la Motte, music theory
Nigel Osborne, composition
Eiji Oue, conducting
Sebastian Peschko, pianist, teacher of lied-accompaniment
Ulrich Pothast, philosophy
Felix Prohaska, conducting
Matti Raekallio, piano
Lajos Rovatkay, organ and early music studies
Gudrun Schröfel, choral conducting
Jean Soubeyran, acting
Klaus Storck, cello 
Siegfried Strohbach, composition
Raphael Thoene, composition
Gerrit Zitterbart, piano
Yi Fan-Chiang, piano

Students

Music 

Tokunbo Akinro, singer
Lera Auerbach, pianist and composer
Markus Becker, pianist
Klaus Bernbacher conductor, event and broadcasting manager
Elizabeth Bergmann (Bergmann Duo), piano duo
Marcel Bergmann (Bergmann Duo), piano duo
Elisabeth Brauß, Pianist
Francis Buchholz, bassist
Ronald Cavaye, pianist
Sa Chen, pianist
Liuben Dimitrov (Genova & Dimitrov), piano duo
Dantes Diwiak, singer
Jörg Duda, composer
Monika Frimmer, singer
Aglika Genova (Genova & Dimitrov), piano duo
Daniel Gortler, pianist, composer
Linda Heins, singer
Claire Huangci, pianist
Kei Itoh, pianist
Gintaras Januševičius, pianist
Nicola Jürgensen, clarinet
Morten Klein, saxophonist, composer
Jan Kobow, tenor
Lutz Krajenski, pianist
Giorgi Latsabidze, pianist
Ingmar Lazar, pianist
Heinz Lengersdorf, pianist 
Georges Lentz, composer
Igor Levit, pianist
Li Yundi, pianist
Michail Lifits, pianist
Dong-Min Lim, pianist
Colette Lorand, soprano
Jun Märkl, conductor
Dany Mann, jazz and pop singer, actress
Cornelius Meister, conductor
Kristin Merscher, pianist
Wolfgang Meyer, clarinetist
Nils Mönkemeyer, violist
Sarah Nemtsov, oboist, composer
Miku Nishimoto-Neubert, pianist
Gustavo Núñez, bassoonist
Gülsin Onay, pianist
Francesco Piemontesi, pianist
Ilya Rashkovsky, pianist
Martin Sander, organist
Martin Schmeding organ
Thomas Schmidt-Kowalski, composer
Wolfgang Schöne, baritone
Gudrun Schröfel choral conductor
Hanna Schwarz, singer
Claudia Schwarze, cellist
Rainer Seegers, percussionist
Wenyu Shen, pianist
Fumiko Shiraga, pianist
Thea Soti, singer
Friedrich-Wilhelm Tebbe, conductor
Lars Vogt, pianist
Bernd Weikl, baritone
Derek Woods, composer
Ka Ling Colleen Lee, pianist
Ching-Yun Hu, pianist

Acting 

Dietrich Adam 
Greta Amend 
Ulrike Folkerts 
Alexandra Henkel 
Thomas Limpinsel
Katja Riemann 
Brita Sommer 
Axel Schreiber
Katharina Schüttler
Arndt Schwering-Sohnrey
Anke Sevenich
Peter Thom
Hans Werner Meyer
Ali Khan Surattee

Journalism 
 Bettina Wulff, media manager

Notes

References

External links

 
Die Hochschule für Musik, Theater und Medien Hannover www.academics.de 

 
Music schools in Germany
Educational institutions established in 1897
Educational institutions established in 1911
Educational institutions established in 1957
Educational institutions established in 1981
Universities and colleges in Lower Saxony
Buildings and structures in Hanover
1897 establishments in Germany
1911 establishments in Germany
1957 establishments in West Germany
1981 establishments in West Germany